Aviv Sade is an Israeli male badminton player. In 2015, he became the runner-up of the Hatzor International tournament in men's doubles event.

Achievements

BWF International Challenge/Series
Men's Doubles

 BWF International Challenge tournament
 BWF International Series tournament
 BWF Future Series tournament

References

External links
 

Year of birth missing (living people)
Place of birth missing (living people)
Living people
Israeli male badminton players